The 2017 IIHF Women's U18 World Championship was the tenth Women's U18 World Championship in ice hockey. The tournament was played in Přerov and Zlín, Czech Republic.  For the third straight year the United States defeated Canada for the gold, winning their sixth title overall. Russia defeated Sweden for the bronze, reversing the outcome of the previous year.

Top Division

Preliminary round

Group A

Group B

Relegation series
The third and fourth placed team from Group B played a best-of-three series to determine the relegated team, Japan was relegated

Final round

Bracket

Quarterfinals

Semifinals

Fifth place game

Bronze medal game

Gold medal game

Final ranking

Tournament awards
Best players selected by the directorate

Source: IIHF.com

Statistics

Scoring leaders 

GP = Games played; G = Goals; A = Assists; Pts = Points; +/− = Plus-minus; PIM = Penalties In MinutesSource: IIHF.com

Goaltending leaders 
(minimum 40% team's total ice time)

TOI = Time on ice (minutes:seconds); GA = Goals against; GAA = Goals against average; Sv% = Save percentage; SO = ShutoutsSource: IIHF.com

Division I

Division I A
Was played in Budapest, Hungary 8–14 January 2017.

Division I B
Was played in Katowice Poland, 8–14 January 2017.

Division I B qualification
Was played in San Sebastián Spain, 26–29 January 2017.  This was the inaugural competition for this level, featuring the debuts of both Spain and Mexico.

References

External links
 IIHF.com 2017 events index

2016–17 in women's ice hockey
2017 in ice hockey
2017
2017
2016–17 in Czech ice hockey
January 2017 sports events in Europe
Sport in Zlín
Přerov District
2017 in Czech women's sport